Grigory Konstantinovich Sanakoev (17 April 1935 – 8 October 2021) was a Russian chess player who held the title of International Correspondence Chess Grandmaster. He was the twelfth World Correspondence Chess Championship (1984–1991) and finished in third place at the "Hans-Werner von Massow Memorial" tournament (1996–2002).
Sanakoev is also the author of a book on correspondence chess titled World Champion at the Third Attempt.

References

External links
 
 
 
 

1935 births
2021 deaths
World Correspondence Chess Champions
Correspondence chess grandmasters
Russian chess players
Soviet chess players
Russian chess writers
Soviet chess writers
Soviet male writers
20th-century Russian male writers
Sportspeople from Voronezh
Writers from Voronezh